is a Japanese actress, model and tarento. She is known for regularly appearing on the NTV morning show Zip! (2013-2015).

Career

In 2009, Hotta participated in the 12th National Beauty Pageant (Japan Bishōjo Contest). Taking that opportunity, she contracted with Oscar Promotion. On November 4, 2012, she won the first runner-up in the Miss Rikkyo University Pageant. In 2013, she hosted the football TV show called Ole! Ardija that aired on Television Saitama. From April 2013 to March 2015, she appeared as a regular guest on the NTV morning show Zip!. In December 2014, she made her television drama debut in Koi Suru Gasshuku Menkyo!. She appeared on the cover of the May 2014 issue of CanCam with Mizuki Yamamoto, she then started working as an exclusive model for the magazine. In March 2015, she graduated from Rikkyo University where she studied French literature.

Appearances

Television
 Ole! Ardija (Television Saitama, 2013), a host
 Zip! (NTV, 2013–2015) as a regular guest
 A Love Camp License! (NTV, 2014) Chisato Akiyama
 Shimura Za (Fuji TV, 2014–2015) as a regular guest
 Isan Sōzoku (TV Asahi, 2015), Rie Minami
 Mr. Housekeeper, Mitazono (TV Asahi, 2016), 
 Kanjo Hachi Gosen Episode 6 (Fuji TV, 2017), Mayu
 Dead Stock Episode 6 (TV Tokyo, 2017), Ume Anzai
 Juyo Sankounin Tantei (TV Asahi, 2017), Makiko Makita
 Doctor-Y (S2) (TV Asahi, Amazon Prime, 2017), Kayako Yotsuya
 Kiss that Kills (NTV, 2018), Nao Mori 
 Mr. Hiiragi's Homeroom (NTV, 2019), Mizuki Morisaki
 The School of Water Business  (TBS, MBS, 2019), Haruka Ounabara
 The Secrets (Fuji TV, KTV, 2020), Aoi Nasu
 Peanut Butter Sandwich (MBS, 2020), Sayo Katagiri
 Isekai Izakaya "Nobu" (WOWOW, 2020), Hermina

Film
 Impossibility Defense (2018)
 Liar! Uncover the Truth (2019)
 Come On, Kiss Me Again! (2020)
 Apparel Designer (2020)
 Humanoid Monster Bela (2020)

Music videos
 Takahiro Nishijima (AAA) Nissy - Dance Dance Dance (3 June 2015)

Radio
 Hitori Joshikai (MBS Radio, 2014)

Commercials
 Otsuka Pharmaceutical - Soyjoy (2013)
 Shogakukan - CanCam (2014)

Events
 Kansai Collection (2015 S/S)
 Girls Award (2014 A/W, 2015 S/S)

Bibliography

Magazines
 CanCam'', Shogakukan 1982-, as an exclusive model since May 2014

References

External links 

  
  

Living people
1992 births
People from Tokyo
Japanese female models
21st-century Japanese actresses
Japanese television personalities
Models from Tokyo Metropolis